Andrew Haug'is a radio announcer and heavy metal musician from Melbourne, Australia. He is one of the most prominent figures in Australia's largely underground heavy metal scene.

Haug started his radio career doing the heavy metal music program The Hard Report for Melbourne community radio station 3RRR. He was most notable as the presenter of the heavy metal music program Full Metal Racket (formerly 3 Hours of Power and currently The Racket) on Australian alternative music radio station Triple J, which he hosted from 2001 to 2011. He has stated that he did not leave Triple J by his choosing.

Haug also plays drums with outfit Contrive, which also features his identical twin brother Paul Haug on lead vocals/guitar.

In 2002, Haug was convinced by Australian comedian John Safran to appear on his SBS television series John Safran's Music Jamboree.  His appearance involved a Christian psychic who monitored him during a radio broadcast and at a Contrive live gig, claiming she could see "dark spirits" who were supposedly attracted to him due to his interest in heavy metal music.

Andrew has also been a guest programmer for the ABC's music video show Rage as well as MTV's Headbangers Ball.

Early years
Andrew was born in Melbourne, Victoria, along with twin brother Paul.

Career
Haug started working in radio in 1993, with a local demo segment on Melbourne's 3RRRFM Metal Show. Haug soon become the lead host of the show, spanning all facets of the program including interviews with several hundred local and international artists right up until leaving the station for a new opportunity.

In 2001 he became the host of Triple J's national weekly metal program, Full Metal Racket. Over his decade-long run he conducted 612 interviews with musicians such as James Hetfield, Ozzy Osbourne, Maynard James Keenan, Ronnie James Dio, Rob Halford, and interviewed Steve Harris of Iron Maiden on board their own plane, Ed Force One. Haug once convinced JJJ management to do a live seven-hour straight metal radio marathon.

In 1995 Haug co-hosted a local TV music show on Channel 31, Metal Vision. This lasted for two years, and included local and international interviews with the likes of Fear Factory and Deicide, as well as general music discussion. In 2002 he hosted the long-standing national TV music show Rage, handpicking five hours of his favourite rock and metal video clips, and in 2006 hosted a four-hour special on MTV's Headbangers Ball dedicated to the acts on that year's Gigantour festival.

Haug has stated that he did not leave Triple J's The Racket voluntarily.

In June 2012 Haug revealed his plan to create a dedicated rock and metal online radio station in Australia. The station was officially launched on 20 November 2012. In 2017, the station started a partnership with platform iHeartRadio.

From 2012, Haug hosted a weekly two-hour metal show, Haugmetal for Soundwave festival's online radio station, Soundwave Pirate Radio.

Haug has written music columns for Kerrang! Australia, Roadrunner Australia's Outsider Magazine, plus weekly metal music columns for various street press magazines.

He was the sole label and marketing manager at the Australian branch of German-based record label Century Media (Arch Enemy, Suicide Silence, Lacuna Coil, Architects) from 1998 to 2014 full time.

Haug manages and plays drums for heavy metal band Contrive with his twin brother Paul. They have released two EPs and three albums to date, and toured the UA in May 2019 with Riverside also played in Australia with Machine Head, Opeth, Stone Sour, Cavalera Conspiracy, Testament, Sepultura, Soilwork, Mayhem, Skinlab, and Parkway Drive.

References

External links
Triple J – Andrew Haug's Profile
Triple J – Full Metal Racket site
Andrew Haug's Facebook Group
The Official Contrive Website
 The Official Andrew Haug 24/7 Rock & Metal Streaming Radio Website

Triple J announcers
Australian heavy metal drummers
Musicians from Melbourne
Living people
21st-century drummers
Year of birth missing (living people)